Jan Kobián (born 28 October 1970 in Prague) is a Czech bobsledder who has competed since 1992. Competing in five Winter Olympics, he earned his best finish of eighth in the two-man event at Nagano in 1998.

Kobián's best finish at the FIBT World Championships was 11th in the four-man event at Calgary in 2005.

References
 
 

1970 births
Bobsledders at the 1994 Winter Olympics
Bobsledders at the 1998 Winter Olympics
Bobsledders at the 2002 Winter Olympics
Bobsledders at the 2006 Winter Olympics
Bobsledders at the 2010 Winter Olympics
Czech male bobsledders
Living people
Olympic bobsledders of the Czech Republic
Sportspeople from Prague